The Dr. Van Buren Knott House is a historic building located in Sioux City, Iowa, United States.  Knott was a prominent local physician.  He had Chicago architect Howard Van Doren Shaw design this Colonial Revival-style house, which is considered an excellent example of the style.  The 2½-story brick structure features a symmetrical facade, an entrance porch with Doric columns, a Palladian window above the front entrance, a single-story semi-circular room in the back, and a hip roof with dormers.  On the south side of the house is a full width porch, with a sleeping porch on the second floor.  A pergola in the back leads to a detached two-car garage, which was built a couple of years after the house.  The house and garage were listed together on the National Register of Historic Places in 1999.

References

Houses completed in 1903
Colonial Revival architecture in Iowa
Houses in Sioux City, Iowa
Houses on the National Register of Historic Places in Iowa
National Register of Historic Places in Sioux City, Iowa
1903 establishments in Iowa